The Red Mulde is a river of Saxony, Germany.

See also
List of rivers of Saxony

Rivers of Saxony
Rivers of Germany